The No. 341 Squadron also known in French as Groupe de Chasse n° 3/2 "Alsace", was a Free French squadron in the RAF during World War II.

History
No. 341 Squadron was formed on 15 January 1943 at RAF Turnhouse, with personnel from the Free French Air Forces (Forces aériennes françaises libres), in particular the personnel of the Free French Flight (also known as Groupe de Chasse n°1 « Alsace » and before as Première Escadrille de Chasse (E.F.C. 1)), which had been operating in the Western Desert alongside various RAF fighter squadrons such as No. 33 and No. 73 squadron from 1940, and had earned an Ordre de la Libération on 21 June 1941. The unit was equipped with Spitfire VBs, its first commander being Squadron Leader René Mouchotte. The squadron moved to RAF Biggin Hill on 21 March 1943 and, re-equipped with Supermarine Spitfire L.F Mk.IXs, began to take part in sweeps over France. The squadron moved to Cornwall on 11 October 1943 for similar operations over Brittany, returning to RAF Merston on 14 April 1944 to join No. 145 Wing. Pierre Clostermann experienced his first aerial combat as a wingman of Sqn Ldr Mouchotte.

After covering the Allied landings in France in June 1944, No. 341 Squadron moved from Tangmere to Sommervieu (B8 airfield) in Normandy on 19 August and arrived in Belgium in September. Armed reconnaissance sweeps over Germany were directed mainly at enemy communications for the rest of the war, apart from a month at Turnhouse during February 1945 to equip with the Spitfire Mark XVI. On 27 November 1945, the squadron gave up its aircraft on transfer to Friedrichshafen and on the following day passed to the control of the Armée de l'Air. On 28 May 1945 the squadron was presented with the Ordre de la Libération (Cross of Liberation).

During the war the Squadron flew 5,469 operations, claiming some 30 aircraft shot down, and losing 21 pilots killed and 6 taken prisoner.

See also
Free French Flight
List of RAF squadrons

References

Notes

Bibliography

 Halley, James J. The Squadrons of the Royal Air Force & Commonwealth 1918–1988. Tonbridge, Kent, UK: Air Britain (Historians) Ltd., 1988. .
 Jefford, C.G. RAF Squadrons, a Comprehensive record of the Movement and Equipment of all RAF Squadrons and their Antecedents since 1912. Shrewsbury, Shropshire, UK: Airlife Publishing, 1988 (second edition 2001). .
 Rawlings, John D.R. Fighter Squadrons of the RAF and their Aircraft. London: Macdonald and Jane's (Publishers) Ltd., 1969 (2nd edition 1976). .

External links

 Squadron histories for nos. 310–347 sqn on RAFweb
 Squadron histories for nos. 341 sqn at Royal Air Force website

341 Squadron
Military units and formations established in 1943
Military units and formations disestablished in 1945
Companions of the Liberation